The Bayside Residence is a 24-floor residential tower in Dubai Marina in Dubai, United Arab Emirates. The 101-unit building was developed by Trident International Holdings. The building features an Oxygen bar called the 02 Lounge, the first in the UAE. The construction of the Bayside Residence began in 2006 and completed in 2008.

References

External links

Bayside Residence Official website
Archgroup Consultants Architect's website (Go to Projects → Residential Development → Bayside Residence)

Residential buildings completed in 2008
Buildings and structures under construction in Dubai